Detective Investigation Files II is a 40-episode 1995 Hong Kong TVB detective drama. It is the second installment in the Detective Investigation Files Series and was aired roughly eight months after the first series concluded. Michael Tao, Joey Leung, Kenix Kwok and Louisa So reprise their roles from the original series, along with new cast members Amy Kwok, Joseph Lee and Sammi Cheng. This series featured twelve cases.

Synopsis
Detective Investigation Files II is a 40-episode 1995 Hong Kong TVB detective drama. It is the second installment in the Detective Investigation Files Series and was aired roughly eight months after the first series concluded. Michael Tao, Joey Leung, Kenix Kwok and Louisa So reprise their roles from the original series, along with new cast members Amy Kwok, Joseph Lee and Sammi Cheng. This series featured twelve cases.
Tai Yung (Michael Tao Tai-Yu) and Jesse's (Kenix Kwok Ho-Ying) relationship went on really well until Michael's colleague Carmen (Amy Kwok Oi Ming) fell in love with Tai Yung. She is a bit mentally unstable, due to some incidents that have happened to her before when she was in U.K. In one case she got injured trying to save Tai Yung. Tai Yung, as nice as he always is, did everything to help her recover. Everyone with some TV-watching experience can imagine what this may have caused to Tai Yung's and Jessie's relationship. They break up and Carmen took the opportunity to get near Tai Yong, but they never formally get together.

Cast

Tseung Kwan O Police Station

Ko family

Lee family

Nam Family

Cheung Family

Others

Cases

Case 1：Death by Perfume (Episode 1-4)

Case 2: The Burned Corpse (Episode 4-6)

Case 3: Mysterious Resurrection (Episode 7-9)

Case 4: A Kidnap Within A Kidnap (Episode 10-12)

Case 5: Seven Years Ago... (Episode 13-15)

Case 6: Death Warning (Episode 16-19)

Case 7: The Lady in Red (Episode 20-22)

Case 8: A Mother's Love (Episode 23-26)

Case 9: Unwanted Memories (Episode 27-30)

Case 10: Sisters Reunion (Episode 31-33)

Case 11: The Tuen Muk Tze Mystery (Episode 34-37)

Case 12: Medical Blunders (Episode 37-40)

See also
 Detective Investigation Files Series

External links
Detective Investigation Files II TVB official website

TVB
TVB dramas
1995 Hong Kong television series debuts
1996 Hong Kong television series endings
Cantonese-language television shows